Yip-Yip is an experimental, electronic music duo from Winter Park, Florida formed in March 2001, known for their unique style combining aspects of electronica, ska, and jazz and for their eccentric costumes.

Style 
Their music is often cited as and includes elements of experimental, avant-garde, electro, casiocore, ska, jazz, and many more, in interviews when asked to classify the genre of their music Esser has said the influences for Yip-Yip’s sound combine with their own unique style to create a different type of genre he can’t even put a name to "It is hard to pinpoint what our sound actually is. We say it’s experimental or electronic, but we’re trying to think of a cooler name for it. Our music is something different, something interesting." terms such as "spazz-tronic", "electroniska", and "technuwave" have been created to better fit the band's sound.

History 
The duo consists of Jason Temple (Yip 1), & Brian Esser (Yip 2). The pair met while still in high school and started writing music together soon after. They have self-released and home recorded 3 full length albums, 1 EP, & 2 singles. They have gained nationwide and international recognition playing in 39 US states, 2 Canadian provinces, and 7 European countries, touring with many obscure acts including The Show is the Rainbow, The Locust, An Albatross, Mixel Pixel, Health, Genghis Tron, Sleeping People, Green Milk from the Planet Orange, Zom Zoms, and having played alongside Lightning Bolt, Melt Banana, Daughters, xbxrx, Adult, Ruins, Mr. Quintron & Miss Pussycat, Man Man, Battles, Upsilon Acrux, AIDS Wolf, Xiu Xiu, Dan Deacon, Animal Collective, Numbers, No Age, Pre, Why?, Horse The Band, and more. They have also been cited locally by The Orlando Weekly as "Best Electronic Act" 9 years in a row 2004, 2005, 2006, 2007, 2008, 2009, 2010, 2011, and 2012

Equipment 
Current set-up as listed according to the band's MySpace page: Korg MS-10, Micromoog, Moog Concertmate MG-1, Ace Tone Top 5, Yamaha E♭ Alto Saxophone, Electro Harmonix POG, Moogerfooger Freqbox, Moogerfooger Ring Modulator, Ibanez AD-202, Synare PS-1, Synare Sensor, Simmons Multimallet, Korg Rhythm 55B, Casio CZ-101, ARP Omni II, Crumar T-1, Yamaha CP10, Boss Doctor Rhythm DR-110, Casio SK-1, Casio VL-1, Casio PT-20, Yamaha VSS-30, 5 Cymbals, and 1 Gong

Theatrics 

Yip-Yip's live shows are accompanied by eccentric costumes and decorated synthesizers. The costumes were a sort of a way to make the transition from being a recording project to performing live and also as a way to cure the duo's stage fright. All the costumes are made out of their home in Winter Park.

Influences
Yip-Yip's most notable influence is Devo. in an interview Esser said: "One of our biggest influences is Devo. We like their sound and their overall image. I also really like ska music from the ’80s and ’90s,"

Discography

Albums
 1 (Self Released)(CD-R)(2001)
 Skills  (Self Released)(CD-R)(2002)
 Pro-Twelve Thinker (CD-R) (Self Released)(2004)
 Pro-Twelve Thinker (CD/LP) (SAF Records)(2005)
 In The Reptile House (CD/LP) (SAF Records)(2006)
 Two Kings Of The Same Kingdom (CD/DVD) (SAF)(2007)
 Two Kings Of The Same Kingdom (VHS) (SAF)(2008)
 Two Kings Of The Same Kingdom (LP) (It Are Good)(2008)
 Scud Nips I(Scud Nips) (CD-R) (Self Released) (2008)

Ep's And Singles
 High Heel To Mammal EP (CD-R)(Self Released, 2003)
 Candy Dinner Single (Mini-CD-R/Zine) (Self-Released) (2005)
 Club Mummy/Audacity Beach Single(CD-R/Zine) (Self-Released)(2006)

Splits
 Munch Much Mush (Split 7" EP with 2Up) (SAF Records)(2005)

Awards
" Orlando Weekly's "Best Electronic Act" 7 years in a row: 2004, 2005, 2006, 2007, 2008, 2009 & 2010.

External links
 Official Myspace
 Official website
 S.A.F. Records
 It Are Good Records Official Myspace
  Renegade Magazine Interview
 Lubbock Online Interview
 Yip-Yip On YouTube.com

Electronic music groups from Florida
Musical groups established in 2001